Neolithodes agassizii is a species of king crab native to the Western Atlantic.

See also 

 Neolithodes grimaldii, a species which small specimens of N. agassizii may be confused for
Neolithodes indicus, a species originally misidentified as N. agassizii

References

Further reading

External links 

 
 

King crabs
Crustaceans described in 1882
Crabs of the Atlantic Ocean
Invertebrates of Brazil
Biota of the Gulf of Mexico
Crustaceans of the United States
Taxa named by Sidney Irving Smith